Jefferson Davis County Courthouse is a historic county courthouse built in 1907 in Prentiss, Mississippi, the county seat of Jefferson Davis County. The courthouse was added to the National Register of Historic Places on November 10, 1994. It is located at the junction of North Columbia Avenue and 3rd Street.

The building is brick and was designed in a Neoclassical architecture style. A jail was added to its southwest corner in 1985. It was designed by W.S. Hull of Jackson, Mississippi. He designed many other courthouses in Mississippi, Louisiana and Alabama. Until 1903, his county courthouse designs were Richardsonian Romanesque.

See also
National Register of Historic Places listings in Mississippi

References

County courthouses in Mississippi
Courthouses on the National Register of Historic Places in Mississippi
Government buildings completed in 1907
Neoclassical architecture in Mississippi
National Register of Historic Places in Jefferson Davis County, Mississippi